Jianhe County is in the southeast of Guizhou Province, China.

Administration 
Jianhe County administers one subdistrict, 11 towns, one township and 308 villages.

Official website: https://web.archive.org/web/20130420144105/http://www.yxgz.cn/city-76-index.html

Demographics

 Jianhe County's total population: 238400 (2006)
 96% of the minorities populations are mainly Miao and Dong

Climate

References

County-level divisions of Guizhou
Counties of Qiandongnan Prefecture